This is a list of non-League football stadiums in England, ranked in descending order of capacity. There is an extremely large number of non-league football stadiums and pitches in England, and a definitive list of stadia would be impossible to produce. This list therefore includes:

 All football stadiums with a capacity of at least 5,000.
Non-League football describes football leagues played outside the top leagues of a country. Usually, it describes leagues which are not fully professional. The term is primarily used for football in England, where it is specifically used to describe all football played at levels below those of the Premier League (20 clubs) and the three divisions of the English Football League (EFL; 72 clubs). Currently, a non-League team would be any club playing in the National League or below that level. Typically, non-League clubs are either semi-professional or amateur in status, although the majority of clubs in the National League are fully professional, some of which are former EFL clubs who have suffered relegation.

Existing stadiums

See also 

 Record home attendances of English football clubs
 List of Scottish football stadiums by capacity
 List of football stadiums in Wales by capacity
 List of association football stadiums by capacity
 List of European stadiums by capacity
 Development of stadiums in English football
 List of Premier League stadiums
 List of British stadiums by capacity
 List of English rugby union stadiums by capacity
 List of English rugby league stadiums by capacity
 List of association football stadiums by country

References 

 
Association football venues